Adelaide Metro is the public transport system of Adelaide, the capital city of South Australia. It is an intermodal system offering an integrated network of bus, tram, and train service throughout the metropolitan area. The network has an annual patronage of 79.9 million, of which 51 million journeys are by bus, 15.6 million by train, and 9.4 million by tram. The system has evolved heavily over the past fifteen years, and patronage increased dramatically during the 2014–15 period, a 5.5 percent increase on the 2013 figures due to electrification of frequented lines.

Adelaide Metro began in 2000 with the privatisation of existing government-operated bus and train routes. The Glenelg tram line is the only one of Adelaide's tramways to survive the 1950s and the only one to be integrated into the current system. Services are now run by two private operators and united with common ticketing systems, marketing, liveries and signage under the supervision of South Australia's Department of Planning, Transport & Infrastructure. Since the last fifteen years, energy sustainability and eco-friendly transport has been a major focus for Adelaide Metro; in recent years the fleet has been upgraded with electric trains and solar-powered buses–one of which (known as the Tindo electric bus) is 100% solar powered and the first of its kind in the world. Despite this, almost 80 percent of Adelaide's metropolitan buses still run on diesel fuel rather than biodiesel or batteries.

Adelaide Metro has faced criticism for punctuality issues, "unreliable" services, ageing buses and incidents of severely coarse language, racism, and assault on some lines. The complaints increased since the system switched to a private operator in October 2011. Adelaide Metro received 7,562 feedback reports–more than 40 a day–in 2012. In order to counteract these problems and increase accountability, performance data will now be published weekly as opposed to quarterly by Adelaide Metro. This will highlight how trains and buses are performing in terms of punctuality and service, as well as comparisons to interstate public transport. The 2014 service figures indicate that the system performed slightly better in 2014 than it did the previous year.

History 
The Adelaide Metro is a brand introduced in April 2000 following the second round of tenders privatisation of formerly government-operated bus services.

Previously, the public transport system in Adelaide has been known under several names. The State Transport Authority was formed in 1974, combining the metropolitan rail operations of the former South Australian Railways Commission, and the bus and tram operations of the former Municipal Tramways Trust. Adelaide removed almost all tramlines from the 1930s to 1958 leaving only the Glenelg line. This tramline was extended in 2007 by the Department Of Transport, Energy & Infrastructure (DTEI), and again to the Adelaide Entertainment Centre in 2010. In July 1994, the STA was abolished and government public transport services were transferred to TransAdelaide, a publicly owned corporation.

In 1995–96, there was a partial tendering of the bus services. TransAdelaide retained three contract regions, Serco won two contract regions, and Hills Transit a joint venture between Australian Transit Enterprises and TransAdelaide, one. Services were run and marketed under each operator's name, presenting a disjointed network to the public.

The 2000 round of tenders saw the end of TransAdelaide's direct operation of bus services in its own right, although it retained the train and tram services. Serco won the North-South, Outer North, and Outer North-East contract areas, SouthLink the Outer South contract area, Torrens Transit the East-West contract area and City Free services and Transitplus, a joint venture between Australian Transit Enterprises and TransAdelaide, the Hills Contract area. The Adelaide Metro brand was applied across all transport operators, appearing to the public as a unified network, with common livery, timetable designs and a city Information Centre.

Environmental Incentives 
The State Government pledged that the Adelaide Metro would use cleaner fuels like biodiesel and natural gas in an effort to make Adelaide a carbon neutral city, however nearly 80 percent of the Adelaide Metro buses are still run on diesel, which is harmful for the environment due to the presence of sulfur.

Services

Buses 

The largest element of Adelaide's public transport system is a fleet of diesel and natural gas powered buses. The majority of services terminate in the Adelaide city centre, suburban railway stations or shopping centre interchanges. As contracts are revised for privatised bus operations, more cross suburban routes are added to the network, whereas in the past bus routes were largely focused on moving passengers from the suburbs to the CBD.

A major component of the Adelaide Metro bus service is the O-Bahn guided busway to Modbury carrying around 9 million passengers a year. Away from the O-Bahn, whilst there have been dedicated bus lanes and bus only signal phases at some traffic lights provided for a number of years, a major improvement to bus priority and reliability arrived with the delivery in July 2012 of the CBD Bus Lane project.

Adelaide Metro buses are split up geographically into six contract regions:

The new contracts began on 1 July 2020 for a period of eight years with an option to extend for two years.

Former operators which had operated Adelaide Metro services in the past but no longer operate in Adelaide are:
Serco – ended its contract in 2004, at the contracted half-term break-point, after failing to renegotiate its contract on better terms. Serco had previously informed the Minister for Transport that it was not willing to continue to operate the bus services for a further five years on the terms contained in the then existing Contract. Serco had made a submission to the Department of Transport & Urban Planning proposing to operate the bus services in the contract areas on new terms and conditions. The submission was rejected and the contracts retendered.
Transitplus – following the abolition of joint owner TransAdelaide in late 2010, Transitplus services were taken over by joint owner Australian Transit Enterprises' SouthLink.
Light-City Buses – operated the North-South and Outer North East contract areas (including the 300 Suburban Connector and O-Bahn services) from 2011 until its purchase by Torrens Transit in 2018.

Commuter Rail 

The Adelaide suburban railway network consists of six lines operated by Keolis Downer under contract to the Government of South Australia since January 2021.

Until 2014, the suburban network was the only one in Australia to operate solely with diesel railcars. In 2013–2014, the full lengths of the Seaford and Tonsley lines were electrified, as well as the adjacent segment of the Belair line from Goodwood to its terminus at Adelaide; and electric trains have run on the Seaford and Tonsley lines since 2014. Although the original plans were to electrify the remaining three lines, they were abandoned in 2012 The Gawler line was also electrified in 2022.

In July 2019, the government announced the provision of rail services would be contracted out. In January 2021, Keolis Downer commenced an eight-year contract to operate the Adelaide Metro rail network.

As at July 2019, the fleet consists of 70 3000/3100 class diesel railcars and 22 three-carriage 4000 class electric multiple units. All remaining 2000/2100 class train cars were retired from service in August 2015.

The six rail lines all run into Adelaide railway station in the CBD. They are:
This is the most frequent and heavily patronised line on the network. On weekdays some services terminate at Gawler and Salisbury.
Flinders line: a  branch of the Seaford line, running to Flinders.
On weekdays some services terminate at Osborne.
Grange line: a  branch of the Outer Harbor line, running to Grange.
On weekdays some services terminate at Blackwood.

Rolling stock

Tram

Adelaide's once extensive tram network was dismantled in the middle of the 20th century leaving only the Glenelg tram running  between Victoria Square in the city-centre and Moseley Square on the beachfront at Glenelg. The majority of the line is on a dedicated corridor though the western suburbs, but travels on roadway in the city from the terminus to South Terrace and along Jetty Road in Glenelg.

An extension of the line from Victoria Square down King William Street then along North Terrace opened in October 2007. A further extension along Port Road to the Adelaide Entertainment Centre opened in December 2009. The line has stops adjacent to key city points, including Rundle Mall, the Adelaide Railway Station and the City West campus of the University of South Australia. A recent extension has added stops adjacent to more key locations including the Festival Theatre, the Art Gallery, the University of Adelaide and the Adelaide Botanic Garden. Construction this new junction, branch lines along the eastern end of North Terrace and King William Road and four new stops began in July/August 2017 and opened on 13 October 2018. There is no fare charged on certain sections of the line.

The line is operated from Glengowrie depot with 15 Bombardier Flexity Classic trams built between 2005 and 2010 and nine Alstom Citadis trams that were built for, but were surplus to their needs of Metro Ligero, Madrid in 2009. The latter were modified by Yarra Trams' Preston Workshops before entering service. A further three unused former Madrid Citadis trams entered service in 2018.

In July 2019, the government announced the provision of tram services would be contracted out. Torrens Connect commenced on 1 July 2020.

Interchanges 
According to Adelaide Metro, interchanges "provide convenient connections between buses and trains. Many also feature Park ‘n’ Ride services and bike storage."
Aberfoyle Interchange – Located in the southern suburbs at the Aberfoyle Hub Shopping Centre with connections to Chandlers Hill, the City and Old Reynella
Arndale Interchange – Located in the north western suburbs at the Arndale Central Shopping Centre
Blackwood Interchange – Located in the south eastern suburbs in the Adelaide Hills and provides train transfers from the Belair line with bus connections to Upper Sturt, Stirling, Crafers and Aldgate
Crafers Park 'n' Ride Interchange – Located in the Adelaide Hills, connections available to Piccadilly, Stirling, Mount Barker and Blackwood
Elizabeth Interchange – Located in Adelaide's northern suburbs and interconnects train services on the Gawler line with bus services to areas around metropolitan Adelaide including Salisbury North, Salisbury, Munno Para, and Smithfield
Flinders University and Flinders Medical Centre – Located in the mid-southern suburbs, these two interchanges (located close together) connect to Marion Interchange, City, Glenelg and the Outer-South.
Glanville Interchange – Located at the bottom of Semaphore Road and provides bus and train transfers from the Outer Harbor line to Port Adelaide, and Osborne
Golden Grove Village – Located in the Outer North-East, may services from the O-Bahn continue to here and connect to Salisbury, Greenwith and Fairview Park
Klemzig Interchange – Located in the inner north-eastern suburbs with bus connections to Oakden and the Circle Line. Intermediate station on the O-Bahn Busway
Marion Interchange – Located in the Mid-South, one of Adelaide's biggest interchanges, connections to City, Glenelg, the Outer-South and Blackwood station
Mawson Interchange – Located in Adelaide's northern suburbs and interconnects train services on the Gawler line and bus services to areas around metropolitan Adelaide including Adelaide, Mawson Lakes and Salisbury
Mount Barker Dumas Street Park 'n' Ride – Located in the Adelaide Hills, connections are available to Strathalbyn (operated by non-metroticket service), Nairne, Murray Bridge (via non-metroticket service operated by LinkSA) and Lobethal via Hahndorf
Noarlunga Centre Interchange
Old Reynella Bus Interchange and Colonnades Shopping Centre – Located in Adelaide's southern suburbs and interconnects trains services on the Seaford line with bus services to the outer southern suburbs including Aldinga, Seaford and Moana
Paradise Interchange – Located in the north-eastern suburbs with bus connections to Para Hills, Athelstone, Newton and Campbelltown, intermediate station on the O-Bahn Busway
Salisbury Interchange – Located in Adelaide's northern suburbs and interconnects train services on the Gawler line with bus services to areas around metropolitan Adelaide including Salisbury North, Paralowie, Burton, Virginia, Greenwith, Elizabeth, Hillbank, Greenfields, Mawson Lakes and Parafield Gardens
Smithfield Interchange – Located in Adelaide's northern suburbs and interconnects train services on the Gawler line with bus services to areas around metropolitan Adelaide including Munno Para, Craigmore and Andrews Farm
Tea Tree Plaza Interchange – Located in the north-eastern suburbs at the Westfield Tea Tree Plaza and the Tea Tree Plus Shopping Centres, terminus of the O-Bahn Busway

Ticketing 

The Adelaide Metro ticketing system is multi-modal, meaning that one ticket can be used to transfer between trains, trams and buses, regardless of the service provider. In September 1987 the Metroticket system developed by Crouzet was introduced. This used magnetic strip technology. In 2010 a contract to introduce the Metrocard smartcard ticketing system was awarded to Affiliated Computer Services. It was rolled out in November 2012. The older system was phased out in 2015.

A trial is being performed to assess whether a mobile ticketing option can be integrated into the network. This option would use NFC technology found in most smartphones.

As a part of a staged upgrade to Adelaide Metro's ticketing system, tap and pay has been rolled out on all trams, with hopes that this will eventually be rolled out to the rest of the Adelaide Metro network as well.

See also 
 Buses in Adelaide
 Commuter rail in Australia
 O-Bahn Busway
 Railways in Adelaide
 Rail transport in South Australia
 State Transport Authority, South Australia
 Trams in Adelaide
 Transport in Adelaide
 Transport in South Australia
 TransAdelaide
 List of public transport routes in Adelaide

References

External links 
Adelaide Metro
Office of Public Transport

Intermodal transport authorities in Australia
Passenger rail transport in Australia
Passenger railway companies of Australia
Public transport in South Australia
600 V DC railway electrification
Government-owned companies of South Australia
Railway companies established in 2000
Australian companies established in 2000